Ross Baumgarten (born May 27, 1955) is an American former professional baseball player who was a pitcher in Major League Baseball for five seasons in the late 1970s and early 1980s.  Baumgarten played for the Chicago White Sox from 1978 to 1981, and Pittsburgh Pirates in 1982.

Early years 

Baumgarten was born in Highland Park, Illinois, and is Jewish. He attended New Trier High School, in Winnetka, Illinois.

College career 
He attended Florida Southern College in Lakeland, Florida, and Palm Beach Community College in Lake Worth, Florida.

Baumgarten then attended the University of Florida in Gainesville, Florida. In 1976, he played collegiate summer baseball with the Hyannis Mets of the Cape Cod Baseball League. He was a left-handed starting pitcher for coach Jay Bergman's Florida Gators baseball team in 1977.  He was drafted by the Chicago White Sox in the twentieth round of the 1977 Major League Baseball Draft.

Professional career 

While pitching for the White Sox's Appleton, Wisconsin minor league club in 1978, Baumgarten was 9–1 with a 1.82 earned run average (ERA) as a starting pitcher, and earned promotion to the White Sox major league club.

Baumgarten posted a win–loss record of 13–8 in 1979, and was sixth in the American League with three shutouts.  He finished fourth in American League Rookie of the Year voting, and was voted to the 1979 Topps All-Star Rookie Team.  On July 2, 1980, Baumgarten pitched a one-hitter for the White Sox against the California Angels.  The lone Angels hit was a single by Rod Carew in the top of the seventh inning, and the White Sox won the game, 1–0.

In March 1982, the White Sox traded Baumgarten, together with Butch Edge, to the Pittsburgh Pirates in exchange for Ernie Camacho and Vance Law.  After one season in Pittsburgh, his major league career ended.

Life after baseball 

Ross works at Robert W. Baird in Chicago on a team of financial advisers, as well as a baseball coach at New Trier High School.

See also 

 List of Florida Gators baseball players
 List of select Jewish baseball players

References

External links
, or Retrosheet
Ross Baumgarten - Baseballbiography.com

1955 births
Living people
Appleton Foxes players
Baseball players from Chicago
Chicago White Sox players
Evansville Triplets players
Florida Gators baseball players
Hyannis Harbor Hawks players
Iowa Oaks players
Jewish American baseball players
Jewish Major League Baseball players
Knoxville Sox players
Major League Baseball pitchers
Palm Beach State Panthers baseball players
People from Highland Park, Illinois
New Trier High School alumni
Pittsburgh Pirates players
Tacoma Tigers players
Florida Southern College alumni
Palm Beach State College alumni
21st-century American Jews